UFC Fight Night: Kattar vs. Allen (also known as UFC Fight Night 213, UFC on ESPN+ 71 and UFC Vegas 63) was a mixed martial arts event produced by the Ultimate Fighting Championship that took place on October 29, 2022, at the UFC Apex facility in Enterprise, Nevada, part of the Las Vegas Metropolitan Area, United States.

Background
A featherweight bout between Arnold Allen and Calvin Kattar headlined the event.

A featherweight bout between Ilia Topuria and Edson Barboza was expected to take place at the event. However, Barboza withdrew in late September due to a knee injury and the bout was scrapped.

Drakkar Klose was expected to face 2016 Olympic silver medalist in wrestling Mark Madsen in a lightweight bout. However, Klose pulled out in mid-October due to an anterior cruciate ligament injury. He was replaced by Grant Dawson and the bout was moved to UFC Fight Night: Rodriguez vs. Lemos a week later.

Garrett Armfield and Christian Rodriguez were expected to meet in a bantamweight bout at the preliminary portion of the card. However, Armfield pulled out on fight week due to a staph infection. He was replaced by Joshua Weems. At the weigh-ins, Weems weighed in at 139.5 pounds, three and a half pounds over the bantamweight non-title fight limit. The bout proceeded at catchweight and he was fined 30% of his purse, which went to Rodriguez.

Cody Durden was expected to face Kleydson Rodrigues on the card. However, Rodrigues withdrew from the bout and was replaced by LFA Flyweight Champion Carlos Mota on four days notice.

Results

Bonus awards
The following fighters received $50,000 bonuses.
Fight of the Night: No bonus awarded.
Performance of the Night: Tresean Gore, Roman Dolidze, Steve Garcia and Christian Rodriguez

See also 

 List of UFC events
 List of current UFC fighters
 2022 in UFC

References 

UFC Fight Night
2022 in mixed martial arts
October 2022 sports events in the United States
2022 in sports in Nevada
Mixed martial arts in Las Vegas
Sports competitions in Las Vegas